Utica is a town in Yankton County, South Dakota, United States. The population was 70 at the 2020 census.

Some say Utica is a name derived from the Sioux language meaning "dweller", while others believe the name is a transfer from Utica, New York.

Geography

Utica is located at  (42.980242, -97.498020).

Utica has been assigned the ZIP code 57067 and the FIPS place code 65780.

Demographics

2010 census
As of the census of 2010, there were 65 people, 31 households, and 16 families residing in the town. The racial makeup of the town was 86.2% White, 4.6% African American, 1.5% Native American, 4.6% from other races, and 3.1% from two or more races. Hispanic or Latino of any race were 4.6% of the population.

There were 31 households, of which 25.8% had children under the age of 18 living with them, 48.4% were married couples living together, 3.2% had a female householder with no husband present, and 48.4% were non-families. 41.9% of all households were made up of individuals, and 19.4% had someone living alone who was 65 years of age or older. The average household size was 2.10 and the average family size was 3.00.

The median age in the town was 41.5 years. 21.5% of residents were under the age of 18; 6.3% were between the ages of 18 and 24; 26.2% were from 25 to 44; 26.3% were from 45 to 64; and 20% were 65 years of age or older. The gender makeup of the town was 53.8% male and 46.2% female.

2000 census
As of the census of 2000, there were 86 people, 39 households, and 18 families residing in the town. The population density was 325.2 people per square mile (127.7/km2). There were 43 housing units at an average density of 162.6 per square mile (63.9/km2). The racial makeup of the town was 87.21% White, 4.65% Native American, 4.65% from other races, and 3.49% from two or more races. Hispanic or Latino of any race were 1.16% of the population.

There were 39 households, out of which 25.6% had children under the age of 18 living with them, 38.5% were married couples living together, 7.7% had a female householder with no husband present, and 51.3% were non-families. 43.6% of all households were made up of individuals, and 12.8% had someone living alone who was 65 years of age or older. The average household size was 2.21 and the average family size was 3.32.

In the town, the population was spread out, with 25.6% under the age of 18, 10.5% from 18 to 24, 29.1% from 25 to 44, 20.9% from 45 to 64, and 14.0% who were 65 years of age or older. The median age was 34 years. For every 100 females, there were 126.3 males. For every 100 females age 18 and over, there were 120.7 males.

The median income for a household in the town was $25,417, and the median income for a family was $47,500. Males had a median income of $23,750 versus $18,750 for females. The per capita income for the town was $20,057. There were no families and 4.8% of the population living below the poverty line, including no under eighteens and none of those over 64.

References

Towns in Yankton County, South Dakota
Towns in South Dakota